Willie McVie (born 7 August 1948, in Glasgow) is a Scottish former footballer.

McVie began his career with Clyde, spending 7 years with the Shawfield club before joining Motherwell. He went on to have spells with Toronto Blizzard in Canada and Heart of Midlothian, before retiring in 1981. He now is a publican in Larkhall.

External links

1948 births
Living people
Clyde F.C. players
Expatriate soccer players in Canada
Association football central defenders
Heart of Midlothian F.C. players
Motherwell F.C. players
North American Soccer League (1968–1984) players
Sportspeople from Larkhall
Scottish expatriate footballers
Scottish expatriate sportspeople in Canada
Scottish footballers
Toronto Blizzard (1971–1984) players
Footballers from South Lanarkshire
Scotland under-23 international footballers
Footballers from Glasgow